Nandita or Nanditha is an Indian feminine given name.

Notable people 
 Nanditha (born 1978), Indian singer
 Nandita Adhiya, Indian cricketer
 Nandita Behera, Indian classical dancer
 Nandita Berry, (born 1968), Indian American attorney
 Nandita Basu, Indian-born American environmental engineer
 Nanditha Bose, Indian actress
 Nandita Chandra, Indian actress
 Nandita Das (born 1969), Indian actress and director
 Nandita K.C., Nepali actress 
 Nanditha K. S., Indian poet
 Nanditha Jennifer, Indian actress
 Nanditha Krishna, Indian author and activist
 Nandita Kumar (born 1981), Indian artist
 Nandita Mahtani, Indian fashion designer
 Nandita Palshetkar, Indian gynaecologist
 Nanditha Raj, Indian actress
 Nandita Roy (born 1955), Indian filmmaker and screenwriter
 Nandita Saha, Indian table tennis player
 Nandita Swetha, Indian film actress

Hindu given names
Indian feminine given names